Des McLean may refer to:

 Des McLean (comedian), Scottish stand-up comedian, actor and presenter
 Des McLean (footballer) (1931–2008), Scottish footballer